Mungaru Male 2 is a 2016 Indian Kannada romantic drama film co-written and directed by Shashank. It stars Ganesh, Neha Shetty, V. Ravichandran, and Aindrita Ray. The supporting cast features P. Ravi Shankar and Sadhu Kokila. Although not a sequel, the film's title came as the second installment to the film Mungaru Male (2006). The film found its theatrical release worldwide on 9 September 2016, while in Karnataka, the release was pushed to 10 September 2016 because of the Cauvery water dispute. It was a commercial success at the box office by collecting over ₹20 crore in its lifetime theatrical run.

Cast 
 Ganesh as Preetham
 Neha Shetty as Nandini
 V. Ravichandran as Preetham's Father
 Shilpa Manjunath as Aishwarya/Aishu
 Aindrita Ray as Preetham's Girlfriend
 P. Ravi Shankar  as Nandini's father
 Sadhu Kokila as Nandini's uncle
 Shraddha Srinath as Guest appearance

Prequel
The film Mungaru Male was directed by Yogaraj Bhat, which was released in December 2006, and went on to collect more than 750 million in Indian box office in its lifetime theatrical run of 865-days against a budget of 70 lakh, film had featured Pooja Gandhi and Ganesh.

Production

Development 
After the commercial success of the 2006 film Mungaru Male, which grossed 750 million, the makers conceived a second part for the film, which they had previously planned while shooting for the film was on course. With producer E. Krishnappa objecting to the title Mungaru Male Part 2, the title Preetham Prem Kahani was fixed. Ganesh was to reprise his role as Preetham opposite Ramya. In September, The Times of India carried a report which said that Rockline Venkatesh would produce the film titled Mungaru Male 2, and that it would be directed by Preetham Gubbi, the screenwriter of Mungaru Male. It was reported that Ganesh would reprise his role and the makers were on the lookout for the female lead. The sequel however, did not take off for seven years until reports came out in early-July 2014, when it was announced, albeit by a different team. It was reported that G. Gangadhar, the executive producer of Mungaru Male would produce it. He approached Shashank to direct it, who initially refused, but was keen on directing Ganesh. However, after much insistence, reports said Shashank relented and began working on the film's story and screenplay, which he completed by March 2015. It was revealed that Ganesh would reprise his role in the film as the main protagonist, and that the film would be titled Mungaru Male 2.

Casting 
V. Ravichandran was the second actor to be signed by the makers of the film, in May 2015, though at the time of the announcement, his role in the film was not made clear. However, it was speculated that he would play Ganesh's father. The director Shashank said the search for a "new face" as a female lead began with the announcement of the film. He spotted the photos of a Mangalore-based model Neha Shetty, in the newspapers in February 2015, as reports came out of her winning beauty contest WTN Miss Mangalore, who on being placed at the Miss India South emerged as a runner-up. Keen on having her on the film, he approached her, who, then a student of pre-university course was busy with her examinations. She was eventually signed in July 2015 as the female lead opposite Ganesh. It was also revealed that P. Ravi Shankar and Sadhu Kokila would play supporting roles. Arjun Janya was signed by the makers to score the film's background music and compose six track as part of its soundtrack.

Filming 

At the time of announcement of the film in November 2014, it was reported that the film, unlike its prequel would be filmed over two seasons, the summer and monsoon. The director Shashank said, "[Filming] will go on for five months during the scorching heat of summer as well as during the heavy rains." To coincide with the date of commencing of filming and theatrical release of Mungaru Male, the makers planned on having them on the same dates – 28 July and 26 December 2015 respectively. As scheduled, filming began on 26 July. Major part of the first schedule was filmed in the Malnad region of Karnataka and was completed in late-August. Around this time, it was revealed that Ravichandran would play the role of Ganesh's father in the film. The second schedule began in mid-September. Filming took place in areas surrounding Jog Falls, in the Sagara region of Karnataka. Speaking to The Times of India, Shashank said, "[W]e are capturing a very important sequence at the waterfalls, which will include a major fight sequence. We are also shooting some romantic scenes in the surrounding locations, which are unexplored in Sandalwood." In February 2016, it was reported that most of the filming was complete except the songs. Also reportedly, Ganesh would fly to Slovenia along with Aindrita Ray to shoot for a song together.

Soundtrack

Arjun Janya has scored the soundtrack and score for the film. A total of six songs and one instrumental track were composed by him and written by the lyricists such as Jayanth Kaikini, Kaviraj, Chandan Shetty, Gopi Iyengar and the director Shashank. Noted singers such as Sonu Nigam and Shreya Ghoshal who got their big breaks in Kannada cinema through Mungaru Male recorded their voices to the sequel as well. Bollywood singer Armaan Malik recorded his breakthrough Kannada song and so did the Rajastani folk singer Swaroop Khan. The music for the film was one of the highly anticipated album since its prequel was a musical blockbuster which was composed by Mano Murthy.

The audio was officially released on 5 August 2016 through Jhankar Music label.

Release
The first teaser of the film was released on 5 June 2016 on YouTube. The 107-second video introduces the characters in the film, and actors Upendra, Shiva Rajkumar, Puneeth Rajkumar, Yash and Sudeep feature in it asking questions about the film. An audio teaser was released on 30 July, which was the first of its kind in Kannada film industry. The audio was released on 5 August.

References

External sources
 

2016 films
Films directed by Shashank
2010s Kannada-language films
Films scored by Arjun Janya
Indian romantic drama films
Indian sequel films
Films set in Rajasthan
Films shot in Karnataka
Films shot in Rajasthan
Films shot in Jaipur
2016 romantic drama films